All Saints Church is the parish church of Hampreston, Dorset, England. It is a Grade II* listed building.

History
The tower and nave were built in the early 15th century. The choir was then completed in the late 19th century as was the north nave aisle. The church was then completed by the addition of the porch in the 20th century (The Memorial stone in the Porch suggests that this was done in 1794).

Bells
In 1738, 3 bells were recorded (present 2,3 and 5). Then, in 1800, Thomas Mears added the present 4th and then in 1923, the tenor was cast followed by the treble in 1928 which completes the ring. The tenor weighs half a ton (508 kg). In 2003, Whites of Appleton overhauled the ring and Whitechapel Bell Foundry retuned several of the bells. In 2013, the 5th bell cracked requiring it to be welded.

References

External links
University of Bath - Dorset Churches; Hampreston

Church of England church buildings in Dorset
Grade II* listed churches in Dorset